Kembla Grange Station is a single-platform intercity train station located in Kembla Grange, New South Wales, Australia, on the South Coast railway line. The station serves NSW TrainLink trains travelling south to Kiama and north to Wollongong and Sydney. 
The station ranked equal last for patronage on the metropolitan network in 2012, and was one of 23 on the metropolitan rail network to record an average of fewer than one passenger per day in 2014.

History 
The railway through Kembla Grange was built as part of a South Coast Line extension from Wollongong to Bombo and opened in November 1887. Three years later, Kembla Grange Station was opened to serve the Kembla Grange Racecourse across the road. Kembla Grange is only open on Saturdays, Sundays and other race days. When open, the station operates as an on-request stop. A special siding and loading bank for horses operated at the station between 1912 and 1942. The internal NSW TrainLink code used for the station is KGG, a reference to the racehorses.

The small breeze block waiting shed features a decorative gabled roof, and nameboard designed to suggest a racecourse winning post. The building was installed around the time the racecourse was redeveloped by the Department of Sport & Recreation in 1987.

Electrification reached Kembla Grange in 1993 and electronic ticketing, in the form of the Opal smartcard system, arrived in 2014.

2021 derailment 
On 20 October 2021, a Waterfall bound SCO service from Kiama consisting of Tangara T set T42 would collide with an abandoned van on a level crossing. 4 of the 8 passengers on board were injured, with the driver being trapped among the wreckage. The van was being used to steal a go-kart from Wollongong Kart Raceway when it got stuck on the tracks, and the driver and two passersby were unable to move it off the tracks before the collision.

Platforms & services
Kembla Grange has one side platform, long enough for four carriages. It is serviced by NSW TrainLink South Coast line services travelling between Sydney Central, Bondi Junction and Kiama.

References

External links

Kembla Grange station details Transport for New South Wales

Buildings and structures in Wollongong
Railway stations in Australia opened in 1890
Regional railway stations in New South Wales
Short-platform railway stations in New South Wales, 4 cars